Rudolf "Rudi" Schmidt (15 March 1914 – 23 February 2000) was a highly decorated Major in the Luftwaffe during World War II. He was also a recipient of the Knight's Cross of the Iron Cross. The Knight's Cross of the Iron Cross was awarded to recognise extreme battlefield bravery or successful military leadership.

Despite being half Jewish, or Mischling under the Nuremberg Laws, Schmidt enlisted in the Luftwaffe and served with distinction.

Awards and decorations
 Flugzeugführerabzeichen
 Spanish Cross in Gold with Swords
 Front Flying Clasp of the Luftwaffe in Gold with Pennant
 Iron Cross (1939)
 2nd Class
 1st Class
 German Cross in Gold (13 August 1942)
 Knight's Cross of the Iron Cross on 28 March 1945 as Hauptmann and Gruppenkommandeur of the II./Kampfgeschwader 26

References

Citations

Bibliography

External links
TracesOfWar.com
Ritterkreuztraeger 1939-1945

1914 births
2000 deaths
People from Plauen
People from the Kingdom of Saxony
Luftwaffe pilots
German military personnel of the Spanish Civil War
Recipients of the Gold German Cross
Recipients of the Knight's Cross of the Iron Cross
Reichsmarine personnel
Kriegsmarine personnel
Condor Legion personnel
German World War II pilots
Military personnel from Saxony